Pointon and Sempringham is a civil parish in the English county of Lincolnshire.

Forming part of the non-metropolitan district of South Kesteven its main populated places are Sempringham, Pointon and Millthorpe. The population of the civil parish at the 2011 census was 532.

References

Civil parishes in Lincolnshire
South Kesteven District